Hassan Amzile (born 5 June 1988) is a French boxer. He competed in the men's light welterweight event at the 2016 Summer Olympics finishing ninth.

Bout results

Personal results

Olympic results

References

External links
 

1988 births
Living people
French male boxers
Olympic boxers of France
Boxers at the 2016 Summer Olympics
European Games competitors for France
Boxers at the 2015 European Games
Light-welterweight boxers